Thauera selenatis is a gram-negative rod-shaped motile bacterium from the genus of Thauera with a single polar flagellum. Thauera selenatis has the ability to generate energy by respiring anaerobically with the enzyme selenate reductase.

References

Rhodocyclaceae
Bacteria described in 1993